

Surname 

Kloss is a German surname. Some individuals with the surname include:

 Cecil Boden Kloss (1877–1949), English zoologist
 Dorothy Kloss (born 1923), Americal dancer
 Eric Kloss (born 1949), American jazz saxophonist
 Georg Kloss, (Georg Franz Burkhard Kloss, 1787–1854), German historian and early researcher in the history of freemasonry
 Hans Kloss (artist) (1938-2018), German painter and graphic artist
 Hans Kloss (bank manager) (1905–1986), Austrian bank manager and lawyer
 Hans Kloss (fictional character), a fictional World War II secret agent from the television series Stawka większa niż życie
 Heinz Kloss (1904–1987), German sociolinguist
 Henry Kloss (1929–2002), American audio engineer and entrepreneur
 Ilana Kloss (born 1956), South African tennis player, World # 1 in doubles
 Johann Bartholomäus Kloss (died 1679), Czech painter and graphic artist
 John Kloss (1937–1987), American fashion designer
 Karlie Kloss (born 1992), American fashion model

Businesses 

Rieger–Kloss, pipe organ manufacturing company

See also 
 Kloß (disambiguation)
German-language surnames